Luis Alejandro Olivas Salcedo (born 10 February 2000) is a Mexican professional footballer who plays as a centre-back for Liga MX club Guadalajara.

Club career
Before making his debut for Guadalajara, he spent time with Liverpool on a trial basis.

International career
On November 27, 2021, Olivas was included in the senior national team call-up by Gerardo Martino for a friendly match against Chile set to take place on December 8.

On December 8, 2021, Olivas made his national team debut against Chile in a friendly match. Playing all 90 minutes, the match ended in a 2–2 draw.

Career statistics

Club

International

Honours
Mexico U17
CONCACAF U-17 Championship: 2017

Individual
CONCACAF U-17 Championship Best XI: 2017

References

External links
 
 
 
 

2000 births
Living people
Mexican footballers
Mexico international footballers
Footballers from Nayarit
Association football defenders
CD Tudelano footballers